The 2012–13 season is Tuen Mun Sports Association's 3rd consecutive season in the Hong Kong First Division League, the top flight of Hong Kong football. Tuen Mun will seek to win their first trophy for two seasons, competing in the Hong Kong First Division League, the Hong Kong League Cup and the Hong Kong FA Cup after finishing 6th in the previous First Division League season.

Key events
 16 June 2012: Hong Kong midfielder Lai Yiu Cheong joins the club from 2011–12 Hong Kong First Division League runner-up TSW Pegasus for an undisclosed fee.
 1 August 2012: Hong Kong midfielder Li Haiqiang joins the club from Hong Kong First Division League club South China for free.
 30 October 2012: Due to the divestment of president Chan Keung, which may lead to financial problems, various key players, including Li Haiqiang, Yip Tsz Chun, Ling Cong and 4 foreign players, as well as the whole coaching team, were released by the club.
 2 November 2012: All 4 foreign players, Beto, Diego Eli Moreira, Mauricio Correa Da Luz and Daniel Goulart Quevedo, will stay with salaries decrease.

Players

Squad information
 As of 3 November 2012

Players with dual nationality:
  Xie Silida (Local player)
  Li Ming (Local player)
  Li Haiqiang (Local player, eligible to play for Hong Kong national football team)
  Chao Pengfei (Local player, eligible to play for Hong Kong national football team)
  Wei Zhao (Local player, eligible to play for Hong Kong national football team)

Transfers

In

Out

Loan In

Loan out

Stats

Squad Stats

Top scorers
As of 18 May 2013

Disciplinary record
As of 26 May 2013

Competitions

Overall

First Division League

Classification

Results summary

Results by round

Matches

Pre-season

Competitive

First Division League

Remarks:
1 The capacity of Aberdeen Sports Ground is originally 9,000, but only the 4,000-seated main stand is opened for football match.

Senior Challenge Shield

Quarterfinals

FA Cup

Quarter-finals

Hong Kong AFC Cup play-offs

Notes

References

Tuen Mun SA seasons
Tuen